Cricket at the 2003 South Pacific Games was contested by six teams. The gold medal was won by Papua New Guinea.

First round

The six participating teams were placed into one pool. Papua New Guinea won all five of their matches, including a match against New Caledonia where they scored more than 500 runs. Fiji finished second in the group, thus joining Papua New Guinea in the gold medal match. Samoa and the Cook Islands contested the bronze medal match.

Standings

Bronze medal match

Gold medal match

See also

2003 South Pacific Games

External links
Official site

References

2003
2003 in Fijian sport
2003 in Oceanian sport
2003 South Pacific Games
International cricket competitions in Fiji